Bluey is an Australian television series made by Crawford Productions for the Seven Network in 1976.

The series was another police drama from Crawford Productions, but was different from their previous series—Homicide, Division 4 and Matlock Police—in that it focused on a single detective rather than an ensemble, and that the characters were not stock standard archetypes usually seen in police dramas. Stand-up comedian Lucky Grills was cast as the titular Det. Sgt. "Bluey" Hills who, in contrast to the relatively straight detectives seen in Crawford's previous shows, was obese, drank heavily (even on duty), smoked heavily, visited local prostitutes, and would often enact physical violence to criminals.

Overview

Bluey was set at Melbourne's Russell Street Police Headquarters, with "Bluey" Hills heading his own squad ("Department B"), due to his inability to work within the existing police squads. Department B was given cases that the other departments could not readily solve by conventional means, with Hills applying his unconventional methods to bring about their resolution.

Bluey was supported in his investigations by newly assigned Det. Gary Dawson (John Diedrich) long-time cohort Sgt. Monica Rourke (Gerda Nicolson), and undercover officer Det. Sgt. Reg Truscott (Terry Gill), who spent his time ostensibly working as a small-time burglar, and supplying Bluey with information on the activities of local criminals. Victoria Quilter also featured in early episodes as Dawson's girlfriend Jo Goldman, later replaced by Mercia Deane-Johns as Debbie Morley. Whilst a constant thorn in the side of the Assistant Commissioner (Ken Goodlet) and Superintendent (Fred Parslow), Bluey's methods were highly effective—while other squads didn't want him as a part of their team, they still sought him out when they could not get the job done.

Unlike other Australian TV series where it was common practice to shoot interior scenes on 2.5 cm quadruplex videotape and outdoor shots on film, the series was entirely shot on colour film. The final episode, "Son of Bluey", featured an appearance by actor Don Barker as Det. Sgt. Harry White—the same character he played in Homicide.

Lucky Grills as Bluey

Lucky Grills told TV Week magazine that after playing a guest role in an episode of Matlock Police someone thought of him for the role of Bluey.

His agent sent him a page of script, which he read and then went to audition. After the audition, it took ten days for the call to come through telling him he had the part. "It was Hector Crawford himself calling to tell me I had the role."

Legacy

Around the same time the series was airing, Grills featured as himself in an episode of Crawford's sitcom Bobby Dazzler, as a telethon guest, where reference was made to his role in Bluey.

Although the show only lasted for one year, Bluey found a new audience almost two decades later when dubbed clips from the show formed the basis for the popular The Late Show comedy sketch "Bargearse". In addition to two other guest appearances as himself, Grills also reprised his role as Bluey on The Late Show in order to protest the airing of the last Bargearse sketch. Another enduring element from the show, the theme music—a library music instrumental composed by Brian Bennett titled "New Horizons", is now best associated with coverage of cricket from Nine Network's Wide World of Sports from the 1970s until 2018.

Of the cast members, Gerda Nicolson, died on 12 June 1992, and Lucky Grills died on 27 July 2007. As a result of commentary on the Bargearse DVD release, Victoria Quilter is listed on several Internet sites—including IMDb—as being officially listed as a "missing person". However, as of October 2010, she was alive and well and living in Sydney.

References

External links
Bluey at Classic Australian Television
Bluey at Crawford Productions
Bluey at the National Film and Sound Archive
News of Lucky's Death at 2GB, via Internet Archive
 

Seven Network original programming
Television shows set in Melbourne
1976 Australian television series debuts
1977 Australian television series endings
1970s Australian crime television series
Television series by Crawford Productions
1970s Australian drama television series